Andrew Charles Rhodes (born 23 August 1964) is an English former football goalkeeper and ex-assistant manager of Oldham Athletic.

Rhodes played for Oldham Athletic between 1988 and 1990, capping his time at Boundary Park with an appearance in the 1990 Football League Cup Final, which Oldham lost to Nottingham Forest. He later rejoined Oldham as goalkeeping coach.

Rhodes spent six years playing in the Scottish Premier League with Dunfermline Athletic and
Perth side St Johnstone, and in 1995 had a brief stint on loan at Bolton Wanderers.

Rhodes was the goalkeeping coach at Ipswich Town from 2004 to May 2008. In October 2004, he became registered as an Ipswich Town player to cover for injuries. He remained a reserve keeper at Ipswich until 2008. Ipswich manager Jim Magilton praised his work with the club however after another failed promotion attempt he wanted to shake up his backroom staff. He was the last member of former Ipswich manager Joe Royle's backroom staff to leave the club.

After eight years as head of goalkeeping for Sheffield Wednesday, he left to become assistant manager at Oldham Athletic.

He is the father of Scotland international striker Jordan Rhodes.

References

External links

Rhodes released by ITFC
Andy Rhodes Norwich Alumni Page
Andy Rhodes at Footballdatabase

1964 births
Living people
Footballers from Doncaster
Association football goalkeepers
English footballers
Barnsley F.C. players
Doncaster Rovers F.C. players
Oldham Athletic A.F.C. players
Dunfermline Athletic F.C. players
St Johnstone F.C. players
Norwich City F.C. players
Bolton Wanderers F.C. players
Airdrieonians F.C. (1878) players
Scarborough F.C. players
Ipswich Town F.C. players
English Football League players
Scottish Football League players
Barnsley F.C. non-playing staff
Ipswich Town F.C. non-playing staff
Oldham Athletic A.F.C. non-playing staff
Preston North End F.C. non-playing staff
Sheffield Wednesday F.C. non-playing staff
English people of Scottish descent
Association football goalkeeping coaches